Deinococcus apachensis is a species of bacteria in the phylum Deinococcota. Strains of this species were isolated from soil samples from Arizona after exposure to more than 15 kGy of radiation.

References

External links
Type strain of Deinococcus apachensis at BacDive -  the Bacterial Diversity Metadatabase

Deinococcales
Polyextremophiles
Radiodurants
Bacteria described in 2005